Frank Richard George Lampard (born 20 September 1948) is an English former professional footballer who played as a left-back. He played most of his career for West Ham United, had a brief spell with Southend United, and was capped twice for the England national team. He is the father of former Chelsea midfielder and former Everton FC manager, Frank Lampard, and is often referred to as "Frank Lampard Senior" or "Frank Senior" when there is a chance of confusion between the two.

Early life
Lampard was born in East Ham, Essex, in 1948 to Frank Richard Lampard (born 1920) and Hilda D. Stiles (born 1928). He has a sister, Gwendoline, who is a year younger than him. He was only five years old when his father died in 1953, aged 33.

Club career
Lampard started for the youth team of West Ham United in 1964. He debuted for West Ham United in November 1967 in a 3–2 home defeat by Manchester City, and quickly established himself in his preferred left-back position. Lampard was awarded a testimonial game by West Ham on 2 November 1976; a West Ham XI playing Fulham at the Boleyn Ground resulting in a 3–1 win for West Ham.

At club level, he won two FA Cups with West Ham, in 1975 and 1980, and the old second division title in 1981. By the time he left the club on a free transfer at the end of the 1984–85 season, Lampard had played 660 games, scored 22 goals and become one of the most celebrated players to pull on the claret and blue shirt. He wore the number 3.

He moved to Southend United for the 1985–86 season, then managed by another ex-West Ham star Bobby Moore, and made 38 appearances for the Essex club before retiring.

International career
At international level, Lampard won four England Under-23 caps, and debuted for the England senior national team against Yugoslavia in October 1972.

Managerial career
From 1994 to 2001 he returned to West Ham to serve as assistant manager under Harry Redknapp, his brother-in-law.

On 24 November 2008, Lampard was appointed as a football consultant to new Watford manager Brendan Rodgers. and then followed Rodgers to Reading in June 2009 to take up a similar role at the Madejski Stadium in June 2009. Lampard left Reading when Rodgers departed by mutual consent on 17 December 2009.

Personal life
Lampard was married to Patricia Harris before her death on 24 April 2008 following complications from pneumonia. They had three children named Natalie, Claire and Frank Jr, who was also a professional footballer and manager.
Patricia's twin sister is Sandra Redknapp, wife of former Queens Park Rangers manager Harry Redknapp. He is also the uncle to former England, Liverpool, Tottenham Hotspur, AFC Bournemouth and Southampton player Jamie Redknapp. In 2019, Lampard became the landlord of The Nightingale public house in Wanstead, London.

Honours
West Ham United
FA Cup: 1974–75, 1979–80
Second Division: 1980–81

References

1948 births
Living people
Sportspeople from Essex
English footballers
Footballers from East Ham
Association football defenders
England international footballers
England under-23 international footballers
FA Cup Final players
English Football League players
West Ham United F.C. players
Southend United F.C. players
Watford F.C. non-playing staff
West Ham United F.C. non-playing staff
Reading F.C. non-playing staff
Frank